CDO Foodsphere, Inc., commonly known as CDO, is a Philippine meat processing company based in Valenzuela, Metro Manila. The company was founded by Corazon Dayro Ong on June 25, 1975 as CDO Food Products. In 1981, the company registered as a corporation under as Foodsphere Inc. with CDO becoming the flagship brand. 

Its products include sausages, hams, bacon, hamburger patties, loaves and sweet preserves. Many of its products are marketed under the CDO brand name. In 2009, the company ventured into the Canned Tuna and broke the monopoly by introducing corned tuna.

In April 2020, CDO Foodsphere launched its online food delivery service through the Viber messaging app.

Subsidiary 
 Odyssey Foundation, Inc.

References

External links 
 

Companies based in Valenzuela, Metro Manila
Meat companies of the Philippines
Food and drink companies established in 1975
Philippine companies established in 1975
Privately held companies of the Philippines